Luke Rex Butterworth (born 28 October 1983) is a former Australian cricket player, who played interstate cricket for Tasmania and club cricket for Glenorchy.

Butterworth became a regular in Tasmania's one-day side, but had to wait until 2006/07 to make his first-class debut. Although he was not a regular in the side during Tasmania's first Pura Cup winning season in 2006/07, he did play an outstanding role in the final, scoring 66 and 106, his maiden first class century. He also took 4/33 in the first innings, and his combined efforts earned him the distinction of being man of the match in Tasmania's first ever Pura Cup winning final. He was called up to the Australian A team that toured Pakistan in 2007.

In the 2010–11 Sheffield Shield season, Butterworth was the leading wicker-taker, taking 43 wickets at an average of 15.04.

References

1983 births
Living people
Australian cricketers
Tasmania cricketers
Scotland cricketers
Cricketers from Hobart
Sydney Thunder cricketers
Australian cricket coaches